Ryohei Michibuchi (born 16 June 1994) is a Japanese professional footballer who plays as a winger.

Career

Asia
After attending Meiji University, Michibuchi joined Ventforet Kofu, making his senior debut in 2017. He spent two seasons at the club before switching to Vegalta Sendai.

In February 2021, Michibuchi went abroad to South Korea and joined K League 2 club Chungnam Asan. He was released from his contract three months later.

Europe
In June 2021, Michibuchi arrived in Serbia and signed with Radnički Niš, becoming the second Japanese player in club history (after Ryota Noma).

Personal life
In July 2017, Michibuchi was arrested for domestic violence.

Career statistics

References

External links

 
 
 
 

1994 births
Living people
Association football people from Miyagi Prefecture
Japanese footballers
Association football midfielders
Ventforet Kofu players
Vegalta Sendai players
Chungnam Asan FC players
FK Radnički Niš players
J1 League players
J2 League players
K League 2 players
Serbian SuperLiga players
Japanese expatriate footballers
Expatriate footballers in South Korea
Expatriate footballers in Serbia
Japanese expatriate sportspeople in South Korea
Japanese expatriate sportspeople in Serbia